Hontubby is an unincorporated community in Le Flore County, Oklahoma, United States. The mayor is Brandon Moody.

History
Hontubby was named for a local Choctaw Indian whose name means "wait and kill" in his native language.

References

Unincorporated communities in Oklahoma
LeFlore County, Oklahoma